Aaron Egbele (born 29 January 1979, in Benin City) is a Nigerian sprinter. Egbele was a part of the Nigerian team that won the bronze medal in the 2004 Olympics 4 x 100 metres relay.

In the 2003 World Championships in Paris, he competed in both 100 and 200 metres, but was knocked out in the heats.

External links
 

1979 births
Living people
Nigerian male sprinters
Athletes (track and field) at the 2004 Summer Olympics
Olympic athletes of Nigeria
Olympic bronze medalists for Nigeria
Medalists at the 2004 Summer Olympics
Olympic bronze medalists in athletics (track and field)
African Games silver medalists for Nigeria
African Games medalists in athletics (track and field)
Athletes (track and field) at the 2003 All-Africa Games
Sportspeople from Benin City
21st-century Nigerian people